= Vinyl of the day =

Online community

#vinyloftheday
- Website type: Music
- Available in: English
- Owner: Vinyl Of The Day Pte Ltd.
- Creator: Kurt Loy
- Revenue: Advertisement, Vinyl and Audio Gear sales, Marketplace Seller Fees
- Commercial: Partially
- Registration: Optional
- Launched: March 2013; 13 years ago

Vinyl of the day, or #vinyloftheday, is a website and an online community that aims to bring vinyl and music collectors together. It is currently one the biggest vinyl community in Southeast Asia, with a growing presence in the rest of Asia.

It consists of a digital content arm, marketplace, as well as a mobile app.

== History ==
#vinyloftheday was established in 2013.

It started as a collaborative ‘social visual’ project by Singapore-based fans of music and DJs/Producers Kurt, Darren Dubwise and Gerald Ang.

Most of the #vinyloftheday's employees are working DJs, producers, musicians, and music curators.

Today, #vinyloftheday has evolved into a marketplace, and has a mobile app on Google Play Store and Apple App Store.

== Digital Content Arm ==
The digital content arm aims to document vinyl collectors in their environment; and also feature music pieces, individuals, collectives and their experiences of the analogue world through various online and physical platforms as well as music-related news.

Taking a community-driven approach, #vinylofthday has grown to have a strong presence on social networks like Facebook and Instagram.

== Marketplace ==
#vinyloftheday also consist of an online store selling records, used vinyl, turntables, and merchandise. Marketplace is launched on 9 March 2017. Currently it's only available for iOS with Android version coming soon.

== Events and Collaborations ==
A strong supporter of the arts and culture scene, #vinyloftheday is also active in building the community offline, and has been featured by the Singapore Memory Project.

In 2013, it launched Record Store Day, in collaboration with Vinylicious Record Store, a first of its kind in Singapore and Southeast Asia.

It also regularly holds vinyl parties in underground fashion/skate shops in Shanghai, China; and is involved in cultural events such as Keong Siak Festival 2016 in Singapore.
